Northumbria Police is a territorial police force in England. It is responsible for policing the metropolitan boroughs of Newcastle upon Tyne, Gateshead, North Tyneside, South Tyneside and the City of Sunderland, as well as the ceremonial county of Northumberland. It is the largest police force in the North East by geographical area and number of officers.

Organisation
, it has 3,155 police officers, 125 special constables, 204 police community support officers and 1,649 police staff.

The force's headquarters are located in Wallsend, North Tyneside. However, significant numbers of functions have been dispersed to various locations throughout the force area as part of plans to reduce costs, with the stated intention of operating without a traditional headquarters function. 
, the chief constable is Winton Keenen.

The force uses a variety of vehicle, the most common of which are Vauxhall Corsa, Vauxhall Astra, Vauxhall Vivaro, Ford Transit, and BMW 3 Series.

Northumbria Police has two inter-operable communication centres:
Northern Communication Centre (NCC)  deals with all stations and commands north of the Tyne, based at Ponteland, Northumberland.
Southern Communication Centre (SCC)  deals with all stations and commands south of the Tyne, based at South Shields police station.

History
The force was formed in 1974 by merging the Northumberland Constabulary with part of the Durham Constabulary. The police forces for the county boroughs of South Shields, Gateshead, Sunderland, Newcastle upon Tyne and Tynemouth had already been amalgamated into their respective county forces in 1969, with the Berwick-upon-Tweed police having been merged into Northumberland County Constabulary in 1921.

Notable operations
Fugitive Raoul Moat was pursued by Northumbria Police in the 2010 Northumbria Police manhunt. Moat targeted Northumbria Police officers after his release from HM Prison Durham. A manhunt was initiated by Northumbria Police, calling upon mutual aid assistance from the armed response units of other police forces in support of Northumbria's armed officers. Neighbouring police forces offered support, as well as forces as far away as the Metropolitan Police, which deployed 40 firearms officers trained in the use of sniper rifles. The Police Service of Northern Ireland dispatched 20 specialist off-road armoured vehicles to help in the search on rough terrain in Northumberland. Since this operation, Northumbria Police has significantly increased its armed response capacity.

In January 2014, Northumbria Police launched Operation Sanctuary to investigate sexual abuse gangs targeting vulnerable young white girls. By June 2014, the operation had identified 80 victims and the total number of arrests had reached a 104.

Public controversies
In May 2016, details emerged of an affair between former Chief Constable Mike Craik and then Assistant Chief Constable Carolyn Peacock. Peacock's husband  also then a serving police officer  found out about the affair at a barbecue, and attacked Craik. Officers from Northumbria Police were called to the incident, which was later removed from all police logs on order of the chief constable, and legally banned from reporting in the courts. The legal bans were lifted, after the former head of legal sued the force for unfair dismissal.

Proposed mergers
Under proposals made by the Home Secretary on 6 February 2006, Northumbria was to merge with Cleveland Police and Durham Constabulary to form a single strategic police force for North East England. Both Northumbria and Durham favoured this proposal, while Cleveland expressed a wish that it be merged with the southern area of the Durham force. All proposals regarding force mergers were subsequently dropped nationwide.

Funding cuts
Since 2010, Northumbria Police has suffered the most significant funding cuts of any UK police force due to the austerity, amounting to a 23% reduction in the force's budget. Former chief constable, Steve Ashman expressed fears Northumbria police could soon be unable to provide an adequate police service. Ashman said, "If the day of not being able to provide a professional service was here, I would say it is not here, but it is getting very, very close."  Northumbria police received £259.6 million for the year 2017–18 which is up slightly from £259.5M in 2016–17. This small rise is insufficient to compensate for inflation currently at just under 3% per year. Northumbria police experienced a funding cut in real terms.
Most Northumbrian police stations now close at 8.00 pm or earlier, and people needing the police after that time must use the telephone or an interactive service.

Chief officer team
, the chief officer team consists of the following:
Chief constable  Winton Keenen
Deputy chief constable  Debbie Ford
Assistant chief constable  Scott Young
Assistant chief constable (temporary)  David Felton
Assistant chief constable (temporary)  Neil Hutchison

Chief constables
19431946 : Sir Joseph Simpson (knighted KBE in the 1959 New Year Honours)
1969?1975 : Clarence Harrington Cooksley
19751991 : Sir Stanley Ernest Bailey
19911996 : John Stevens
19982005 : Crispian Strachan
20052010 : Mike Craik
20102015 : Sue Sim
20152017 : Stephen Ashman
2017present : Winton Keenen

Officers killed in the line of duty

The Police Roll of Honour Trust and Police Memorial Trust list and commemorate all British police officers killed in the line of duty. Since its establishment in 1984, the Police Memorial Trust has erected 50 memorials nationally to some of those officers.

Since 1900, the following officers of Northumbria Police and its predecessors are listed by the Trust as having been killed while attempting to prevent, stop or solve a criminal act:
 PC George Bertram Mussell, 1913 (shot)
 Sergeant Andrew Barton, 1913 (shot)
 PC George William Wheatley, 1957 (fell from roof while searching for a suspect)
 PC Brian Armstrong, 1966 (stabbed)
 PC Daniel Buckley, 1982 (fell through roof while pursuing a burglar)
 PC Bernard Leslie Bull, 1991 (collapsed and died during an arrest)
 Sergeant William Forth, 1993 (stabbed)
 PC Joseph Geoffrey Carroll, 2006 (the prisoner he was transporting caused the vehicle to crash, fatally injuring the officer)

On 6 November 2017, Constable John Davidson of the Abbotsford Police Department in British Columbia, Canada, was shot and killed while trying to arrest a suspect who had allegedly opened fire in the parking lot of a shopping centre. Davidson had served with the Northumbria Police from 1993 to 2005, before emigrating to join the Abbotsford Police.

See also
Northumbria Police and Crime Commissioner
Law enforcement in the United Kingdom
List of law enforcement agencies in the United Kingdom

References

External links

 Northumbria Police at HMICFRS

1974 establishments in England
Organisations based in Northumberland
Organisations based in Tyne and Wear
Police forces of England
Organizations established in 1974